Jerzy Jan Polaczek (born 24 August 1961 in Piekary Śląskie) is a Polish politician. He was elected to the Sejm on 25 September 2005 getting 39,335 votes in the 31st Katowice district as a candidate for the Law and Justice list. In 2005-2007 he served as a Minister of Transport.

He was also a member of Sejm 1997-2001 and Sejm 2001-2005, 2005–2007, 2007–2011, 2011–2015, 2015–2019, 2019–2023.

See also
Members of Polish Sejm 2005-2007

External links
Jerzy Polaczek - parliamentary page - includes declarations of interest, voting record, and transcripts of speeches.

1961 births
Living people
People from Piekary Śląskie
Members of the Polish Sejm 1997–2001
Members of the Polish Sejm 2001–2005
Members of the Polish Sejm 2005–2007
Members of the Polish Sejm 2007–2011
Members of the Polish Sejm 2011–2015
Members of the Polish Sejm 2015–2019
Members of the Polish Sejm 2019–2023
Law and Justice politicians
Government ministers of Poland
Transport ministers
University of Silesia in Katowice alumni